Étoile Filante Bastiaise or ÉF Bastia was a French association football club from Biguglia, Corsica. Founded in 1920, they last played in the Regional 1, Corsica in the sixth tier of the French football league system, following relegation in 2019. They played at the Stade François Monti, which has a capacity of 1,000.

Between 1961 and 1971, ÉF Bastia merged with SC Bastia to become SEC Bastia. In 1971, the two clubs separated and continued.

In 2020 the club merged with Association de la Jeunesse de Biguglia from the same town, forming a new club Football Jeunesse Étoile Biguglia.

References

Defunct football clubs in France
Football clubs in Corsica
Sport in Haute-Corse
1920 establishments in France
2020 disestablishments in France
Association football clubs established in 1920
Association football clubs disestablished in 2020